Sheema District is a district in Western Uganda.

Location
Sheema District is bordered by Buhweju District to the north, Mbarara District to the east, Ntungamo District to the south, Mitooma District to the southwest and Bushenyi District to the west. The coordinates of the district are:00 32S, 30 24E.

Overview
Sheema District was created by Act of the Ugandan Parliament, and it became operational on 1 July 2010. Prior to that the district was known as Sheema County and was part of Bushenyi District. The district is part of Ankole sub-region. The districts that compose Ankole sub-region include the following districts: 1. Buhweju District 2. Bushenyi District 3. Ibanda District 4. Isingiro District 5. Kiruhura District 6. Mitooma District 7. Ntungamo District 8. Rubirizi District and 9. Sheema District. The sub-region was home to an estimated 2.2 million people in 2002, according to national census conducted that year.

Population
In 1991, the national population census estimated the district population at about 153,000. The national census in 2002 estimated the population of the district at about 180,200. In 2012, the population of Sheema District was estimated at approximately 220,200.

See also

References

External links
  Sheema District Official Website

 
Districts of Uganda
Western Region, Uganda